The 11th National Hockey League All-Star Game took place at the Montreal Forum, home of the Montreal Canadiens, on October 5, 1957. The Canadiens, winner of the 1957 Stanley Cup Finals, played a team of All-Stars for the second consecutive year, with the All-Stars winning by a 5–3 score.

Boxscore

Referee: Red Storey
Linesmen: Doug Davies, Bill Roberts

Notes

Named to the first All-Star team in 1956–57.
Named to the second All-Star team in 1956–57.

Citations

References
 

11th National Hockey League All-Star Game
All-Star Game
1957
Ice hockey competitions in Montreal
October 1957 sports events in the United States
1950s in Montreal
1957 in Quebec